Pendeltåg can refer to several commuter rail systems in Sweden:

Stockholm commuter rail, Stockholms pendeltåg
Gothenburg commuter rail, Göteborgs pendeltåg
Skåne commuter rail, Pågatågen (they are not called pendeltåg locally)
Östgötapendeln